The Election Office is the body charged for implementation of election procedures in Iran and is subordinate to the Ministry of Interior.

List of Heads

See also
Elections in Iran
Guardian Council

References

External links
Official website

Iran
Government of Iran
Elections in Iran